An intake tower or outlet tower is a vertical tubular structure with one or more openings used for capturing water from reservoirs and conveying it further to a hydroelectric or water-treatment plant.

Unlike spillways, intake towers are intended for the reservoir's regular operation, conveying clean, debris-free water for further use.

Construction
An intake tower is typically made from reinforced concrete, with foundations laid in the river or lake bed. It has at least one water-collecting opening at the top, and may have additional openings along its height, depending on the purpose: towers for hydroelectric plants typically have only one inlet, while those in water-processing plants have multiple draw-off inlets. Near the bottom of the tower, depending on the dam construction and plant location, a horizontal or slanted outlet conduit takes the water from the tower into the plant.

The most convenient location for an intake tower is in the proximity of the processing plant. In artificial lakes, those are typically placed near the dam. Lake bed near the dam also provides sufficient water depth to ensure substantial supply to the towers throughout the year, thus the exposed towers can be regularly seen along the dams.

When built near the shore, an intake tower is equipped with a service bridge, used to gain access for maintenance.

Draw-off tower

Draw-off towers are intake towers specialized for drinking water reservoirs. They have multiple openings at various depths, typically equipped with valves, allowing drawing water only from the level where it is of highest quality.

References

See also

 Culvert
 Fish screen
 Gatehouse (waterworks)

Hydraulic engineering
Hydraulic structures
Dams